is a Japanese football player. He plays for Swiss club Neuchâtel Xamax on loan from FC Thun.

Personal life
Havenaar is a son of Dido Havenaar and younger brother of Japanese international Mike Havenaar.

Playing career
Havenaar made his debut for Nagoya Grampus on 23 March 2013 against Sagan Tosu in the J.League Cup in which he came on in the 88th minute for Keiji Tamada as Nagoya won the match 2–1. He was released by the club in November 2015.

On 31 August 2022, Havenaar joined Neuchâtel Xamax on a season-long loan.

Club statistics

References

External links

1995 births
Living people
Association football people from Aichi Prefecture
Japanese footballers
Japan youth international footballers
J1 League players
J3 League players
2. Liga (Austria) players
Austrian Regionalliga players
Swiss Super League players
Swiss Challenge League players
Nagoya Grampus players
SV Horn players
FC Wil players
FC Thun players
Neuchâtel Xamax FCS players
J.League U-22 Selection players
Japanese people of Dutch descent
Japanese expatriate footballers
Expatriate footballers in Austria
Japanese expatriate sportspeople in Austria
Expatriate footballers in Switzerland
Japanese expatriate sportspeople in Switzerland
Association football defenders